Jay Christopher Leach (born September 2, 1979) is an American former professional ice hockey player and currently the assistant coach of the Seattle Kraken in the National Hockey League (NHL). He is a former captain of the Albany Devils.

Playing career
Leach was drafted in the fifth round (115th overall) by the Phoenix Coyotes. After spending several years in minor hockey leagues, he signed as a free agent with the National Hockey League's Boston Bruins on September 26, 2003. While with the Bruins he appeared in his first two NHL games during the 2005–06 season, collecting no points and seven penalty minutes. Leach spent most of his time in the Bruins organization with their AHL affiliate in Providence.  On July 3, 2007, he was signed as a free agent by the Tampa Bay Lightning. He played in two games for the Lightning during the 2007–08 season but spent most of the season in the AHL. On February 26, 2008 he was traded to the Anaheim Ducks.  Later, during the summer of 2008 he signed with the New Jersey Devils. On November 6, 2009, Leach was claimed by the Montreal Canadiens on re-entry waivers from the Devils. On November 28, 2009, due to a high number of injuries to Canadiens forwards, Leach played forward instead of his usual defense position.

Leach was claimed off waivers by the San Jose Sharks on December 1, 2009, and he played 28 games for the Sharks during the season. He recorded his first NHL goal in an 8 to 5 victory over the visiting Nashville Predators on March 11, 2010. He began the 2010–11 season playing for the AHL's Worcester Sharks, but on February 9, 2011, he was traded back to the New Jersey Devils along with Steven Zalewski in exchange for Patrick Davis and Mike Swift.

Coaching career
Leach became an assistant coach with Adler Mannheim of the Deutsche Eishockey Liga in 2014, helping the team in winning their sixth DEL Championship. On July 7, 2015, Leach was appointed as assistant coach to Mike Sullivan for the Wilkes-Barre/Scranton Penguins, affiliate of the Pittsburgh Penguins of the NHL.    Leach was named interim head coach in December 2015 after Sullivan was promoted to be the head coach at Pittsburgh before settling into the position of associate head coach on a permanent basis to new Wilkes-Barre/Scranton head coach Clark Donatelli. Leach departed the Penguins after one season, eventually joining the Providence Bruins as an assistant coach on August 4, 2016. He would be promoted the P-Bruins head coach position prior to the 2017–18 season. In July 2021, the Seattle Kraken announced Leach as an assistant coach to Dave Hakstol for the Kraken's inaugural season. Leach is now looking for a head coaching job at a higher level.

Personal life
Leach is the nephew of both former NHL forward Stephen Leach and University of Maine hockey coach Jay Leach. He was married to Kathryn Tappen, an American sportscaster; they subsequently divorced.

Career statistics

Regular season and playoffs

International

References

External links

1979 births
Living people
Albany Devils players
American men's ice hockey defensemen
Augusta Lynx players
Boston Bruins players
Bridgeport Sound Tigers players
Ice hockey coaches from New York (state)
Long Beach Ice Dogs (ECHL) players
Lowell Devils players
Mississippi Sea Wolves players
Montreal Canadiens players
New Jersey Devils players
Norfolk Admirals players
Sportspeople from Syracuse, New York
Arizona Coyotes draft picks
Portland Pirates players
Providence Bruins players
Providence Friars men's ice hockey players
San Jose Sharks players
Seattle Kraken coaches
Springfield Falcons players
Tampa Bay Lightning players
Trenton Titans players
Worcester Sharks players
Ice hockey players from New York (state)